Marty Wilson may refer to:

 Marty Wilson (poker player) (1957–2019), English professional poker player 
 Marty Wilson (basketball) (born 1966), American college basketball coach